Ayatollah Sheikh Muhammad-Taqi Morvarid (1921 – 22 October 2012) was an Iranian Shia cleric and politician.
He was a member of the first Assembly of Experts representing the Ilam Province electorate. Morvarid won with 367,496 votes, a majority of 99.66%.

Early life and education 
Morvarid was born in Mashhad to the clerical Morvarid family, his father was Sheikh Ali Morvarid, son of Sheikh Ali-Akbar Morvarid. His mother was Halima Qodrati, daughter of Mulla Ali Qodrati. His brother, Ali-Asghar Morvarid was a prominent cleric and author. His cousin Sheikh Hasanali Morvarid was a renowned religious scholar. His great ancestor was renowned laureate and calligrapher Shihab al-Din Abdullah Morvarid (d. 1514).

Education 
He carried out his primary seminary studies in Mashhad, under his grandfather Sheikh Ali-Akbar, and Sheikhs' Hashim and Mujtaba Qazwini. He then travelled to Najaf and studied under Sayyid Abd al-A'la al-Sabziwari. He also travelled to Qom to continue his advanced seminary studies under Muhaqiq al-Damad, Sayyid Hossein Borujerdi, Sayyid Muhammad-Husayn Tabatabaei, Sheikh Wahid Khursani, Sheikh Husayn-Ali Montazeri, Mirza Jawad Tabrizi and Sheikh Ali Meshkini.

In November 1948, he began to deliver sermons across different cities in Iran.

Personal life 
Morvardi was married and had three sons. His son Muhammad-Reza Morvardi was the governor of Ilam in 2013–2017.

References

See also 
 Assembly of Experts
 Ali Meshkini
 Mohammed Kadhim al-Modarresi

1921 births
2012 deaths
Iranian Shia clerics
Representatives of the Supreme Leader in the Provinces of Iran